Lavrentiy Fomich Tsanava, born Lavrentiy Janjghava (9 August 1900 – 12 October 1955), was a Soviet politician and lieutenant general who served as the head of the Committee for State Security of the Belarusian Soviet Socialist Republic (NKVD) from 1941 until 1951. A close confidant of Lavrentiy Beria, and likewise an ethnic Mingrelian, he was arrested after the death of Joseph Stalin and died in prison awaiting a trial.

Career 
Lavrentiy Tsanava was born in Nakhunavo, in the Kutaisi region of Georgia. He joined the communist party, aged 20, in August 1920 when Georgia was an independent republic governed by Mensheviks. After the Red Army invaion of Georgia, he joined the newly Georgian branch of Cheka. According to an investigation conducted 33 years later:

After his 'disappearance', Beria interceded on his behalf, and had his conviction overturned, and in 1925, he was allowed to resume police work as an officer of what was now the OGPU. After Beria's appointment as first secretary of the Georgian communist party, in 1931, Tsanava was transferred to economic work, initially as Georgia's Deputy People's Commissar for State Farms. In December 1938, after Beria had moved to Moscow and taken control of the NKVD (successor to the OGPU), Tsanava was appointed People's Commissar for Internal Affairs of the Belorussian (Belarus SSR, ie head of the Belorussian NKVD.

In 1944-45, as the Soviet army recaptured territory that had been under Nazi occupation, Tsanava was in charge of wiping out guerilla groups who resisted the return of Soviet rule in Belorussia, and together with Viktor Abakumov, supervised the ethnic cleansing in the Lublin and Lodz regions of Poland, from which tens of thousands of Belorussians, Ukrainians and Lithuanians were deported and replaced by Poles forcibly transported into the area.

Tsanava remained in office after Abakumov took over from Beria and most of the Georgians who held high office in what was now the MGB were sacked. In January 1948, Tsanava received an order that came from Joseph Stalin via Abakumov's deputy, Sergei Ogoltsov, to murder the renowned Jewish actor, Solomon Mikhoels. Mikhoels, who was visiting Minsk, was lured to Tsanava's dacha, and stabbed with a poison needle. The cause of death was officially registered as a traffic accident.

Tsanava was recalled to Moscow late in 1951, after Abakumov had been arrested, and was dismissed from the MGB in 1952. After Stalin's death, in March 1953, Beria regained control of the police, opened an investigation into the death of Mikhoels, and in April had Ogoltsov and Tsanava arrested and charged with murder. In July, unaware that Beria had been arrested, Tsanava sent him a letter praising him and promising  not to "spare himself" in carrying out Beria's orders. But in August 1953, he wrote a letter from Butyrka prison hospital pleading for his release, claiming that he had been victimised as an act of revenge "on the part of enemy of the people Beria and his inner circle". But he was held in prison, and an investigation completed on 10 October 1955 charged him with a long list of abuses, in which innocent people were arrested, some were tortured, and were either executed or sentenced to long terms in labour camps. He was also accused of having boasted of his close connection with Beria. Beria appears to have helped Tsanava's son and a friend escape justice after they had raped a girl. However, a note from the prosecutor said that Tsanava was in hospital, too ill to stand trial. He died on 12 October 1955.

References

Bibliography
 
 

1900 births
1955 deaths
Bolsheviks
Commissars 3rd Class of State Security
Directors of intelligence agencies
First convocation members of the Supreme Soviet of the Soviet Union
Georgian Soviet Socialist Republic people
K. D. Ushinsky South Ukrainian National Pedagogical University alumni
Members of the Supreme Soviet of the Byelorussian SSR (1938–1946)
Mingrelians
Ministers of State Security of the Byelorussian Soviet Socialist Republic
People from Samegrelo-Zemo Svaneti
People from Kutais Governorate
People of World War II from Georgia (country)
People's Commissars for Internal Affairs of the Byelorussian Soviet Socialist Republic
Prisoners who died in Soviet detention
Second convocation members of the Supreme Soviet of the Soviet Union
Soviet Georgian generals
Soviet Georgian NKVD officials
Soviet people who died in prison custody
Third convocation members of the Supreme Soviet of the Soviet Union